The 1971 Wake Forest Demon Deacons football team was an American football team that represented Wake Forest University during the 1971 NCAA University Division football season. In their third season under head coach Cal Stoll, the Demon Deacons compiled a 6–5 record and finished in a tie for third place in the Atlantic Coast Conference.

Schedule

Roster

Team leaders

References

Wake Forest
Wake Forest Demon Deacons football seasons
Wake Forest Demon Deacons football